M256 may refer to:

 M256 smoothbore gun, the main armament of the M1 Abrams#M256 smoothbore gun tank
 Mercedes-Benz M256 engine
 Soviet submarine M-256